Novominsk is a Hasidic dynasty, originating in Mińsk Mazowiecki, Poland, and now based in the United States. It also runs a yeshiva known as Yeshivas Novominsk - Kol Yehuda, currently led by Rabbi Yosef Mermelstein.

From 1976 until his death in 2020, it was led by its Rebbe, Grand Rabbi Yaakov Perlow, who served as Rosh Agudas Yisroel in America: The spiritual head of Agudath Israel of America, and was also a member of its Moetzes Gedolei HaTorah ("Council of Torah Sages"). He was succeeded by his sons, Grand Rabbi Yehoshua Heschel Perlow, and Grand Rabbi Yisrael Perlow, as the new Novominsker Rebbes.

Lineage of the Novominsk dynasty

See also
History of the Jews in Poland
Lithuanian Hasidism

References 

Hasidic dynasties of Poland
Hasidic Judaism in the United States
Orthodox Judaism in Poland
Polish-Jewish culture in the United States